The Rhythm Devils Concert Experience is a 2008 two-disc DVD concert and documentary of the Rhythm Devils 2006 tour, featuring members of the Grateful Dead, Phish, The Other Ones, and Deep Banana Blackout. The name "Rhythm Devils" was originally a nickname for Dead drummers Mickey Hart and Bill Kreutzmann. Hart and Kreutzmann formed the band in 2006 and used the name as the group's moniker.

Disc one features concert footage from Chicago, Illinois, and Sayerville, New Jersey recorded in October 2006, featuring all original compositions with lyrics by Grateful Dead lyricist Robert Hunter. Disc two features behind the scenes interviews, sound check footage, and excerpts from various live concerts.

Track listing
"Comes the Dawn"
"Fountains of Wood"
"The Center"
"7 Seconds"
"Your House"
"Arabian Wind"
"See You Again"
"Next Dimension"

Personnel
Mickey Hart – drums, percussion
Bill Kreutzmann – drums, percussion
Mike Gordon – bass, vocals
Steve Kimock – guitar
Jen Durkin – vocals
Sikiru Adepoju – percussion

References

Pizek, Jeff. "Mickey Hart: Unity, Healing through the Beat", Daily Herald, July 4, 2008
Kilgore, Kym. "Mickey Hart Band Drums Up US Tour", Live Daily, May 23, 2008
Graff, Gary. "Hart: The Dead Happy To Rock Again For Obama", Billboard, July 1, 2008
Greenberg, Rudi. "Rhythm Devil: Mickey Hart", Express, July 9, 2008
"Mickey Hart Band Announces US Summer Tour and Rhythm Devils DVD out in June", All About Jazz, May 20, 2008

External links
 
Mickey Hart official website
Bill Kreutzmann official website

2008 films
American documentary films
Documentary films about rock music and musicians
Rhythm Devils video albums
2000s English-language films
2000s American films